USS Livingston may refer to:

See also
 , a World War II Liberty ship

United States Navy ship names